The 2023–24 Gujarat SFA Club Championship is the second season of the top tier football league of Gujarat. The season started on 3 September 2022, and will end in 2023.

Changes in format
The following changes were made in the league.
 Twelve teams played qualifier round where the three group toppers and two best group runners-up qualified for the league stage.
 The five teams from the qualifying round were joined by previous season's top five teams.
 The final round will see ten teams playing in a double round robin league format where the top team will be champion and nominated for the 2023–24 season of I-League 2.
 The bottom two teams in the final round will be relegated to the inaugural second division in the upcoming season.

Teams
Participating in qualifiers.

Participating in league stage.

Qualifiers

Group A

Group B

Group C

League stage

Standings

References

External link
GSFA

Football in Gujarat
3
2022–23 in Indian football